Azem Vllasi (born 23 December 1948) is a senior Kosovo Albanian politician and lawyer.

Early years 
Vllasi was born in Robovac, Kosovska Kamenica, Yugoslavia, in today's Kosovo.
In his youth and student years, Vllasi chaired a number of youth organizations: the student league of Kosovo and of Yugoslavia, and from 1974, the League of Socialist Youth of Yugoslavia. As socialist youth chairman, he became popular and gained the support of President Tito, which helped him to become the first re-elected youth leader. After graduation, he became a lawyer before joining big politics. In 1980, he publicly challenged the autocratic ruler of Albania, Enver Hoxha, claiming that ethnic Albanians in Yugoslavia were better off than people in Albania and describing his rule as brutal and dictatorial. Azem Vllasi was a Chevening Scholarship holder in early 1970s and studied at the University of Cambridge in the United Kingdom.

Leader of Kosovo and dismissal 
Later on, Vllasi became a member of the central committee of the League of Communists of Yugoslavia and became the leader of the League of Communists of Kosovo in 1986, and the president of Kosovo. Under Vllasi, the Albanian-led Party took a more assertive position towards the Serbian government, and could be expected to put up strong opposition to any moves to reassert Serbian authority over Kosovo. The autonomous province of Kosovo at the time had an equal vote in the federal presidency of Yugoslavia with the Yugoslav republics, and its own executive body, legislature, and judiciary.

In November 1988, Azem Vllasi and Kaqusha Jashari, as the two top-ranked Kosovo politicians, were toppled in the Anti-bureaucratic revolution because of their unwillingness to accept the constitutional amendments curbing Kosovo's autonomy, and replaced by appointees of Slobodan Milošević, the leader of the League of Communists of Serbia at the time. In response to this, the local population started a series of public demonstrations and a general strike, particularly the 1989 Kosovo miners' strike.

A partial state of emergency in Kosovo was declared on February 27, 1989, and the newly appointed leaders resigned on February 28. Soon thereafter, Kosovo's legislature, under a threat of force authorised by the federal presidency, acquiesced and passed the amendments allowing Serbia to assert its authority over Kosovo. Vllasi was arrested by the police on the charges of "counter-revolutionary activities". He was released from the Točak prison in Titova Mitrovica in April 1990.

Today 
Vllasi survived the war years and works today as a lawyer, author, and political adviser/consultant. He is a member of the Social Democratic Party of Kosovo (PSDK).  In December 2005, Kosovo's prime minister Bajram Kosumi appointed Vllasi as special adviser for negotiations over the final status of Kosovo.  Vllasi also served as a political advisor to Kosovo's prime minister Agim Çeku.

Vllasi is married to Nadira Avdić-Vllasi, a Bosniak journalist. They have two children, Adem, a practicing attorney in the United States, and Selma, a medical practitioner who also lives and works in the United States.

Annotations

References

External links 

 Interview (in Bosnian)

1948 births
Living people
People from Kamenica, Kosovo
Kosovo Albanians
Social Democratic Party of Kosovo politicians
Kosovan writers
University of Pristina alumni
Kosovan lawyers
Kosovan prisoners and detainees
Prisoners and detainees of Yugoslavia
Yugoslav prisoners and detainees
Kosovan Muslims
League of Communists of Kosovo politicians
Central Committee of the League of Communists of Yugoslavia members
Yugoslav Albanians